George H. Stanger (September 25, 1902 – March 2, 1958) was an American Republican Party politician who served in the New Jersey Senate from 1938 to 1946.

A resident of Vineland, New Jersey, Stanger was born in Glassboro, New Jersey. He attended Bridgeton High School and graduated from Lafayette College.

References

1902 births
1958 deaths
Bridgeton High School alumni
Lafayette College alumni
Republican Party New Jersey state senators
Majority leaders of the New Jersey Senate
Presidents of the New Jersey Senate
People from Glassboro, New Jersey
People from Vineland, New Jersey
Politicians from Cumberland County, New Jersey
20th-century American politicians